W. G. Bagnall was a locomotive manufacturer from Stafford, England which was founded in 1875 and operated
until it was taken over in 1962 by English Electric.

History 
The company was founded in 1875 by William Gordon Bagnall. The majority of their products were small four- and six-coupled steam locomotives for industrial use, and many were narrow gauge. They were noted for building steam and Diesel locomotives in standard and narrow gauges. Some of Kerr Stuart's designs were brought to Bagnalls when they employed Kerr Stuart's chief Draughtsman. Examples of such locomotives can be seen on the Sittingbourne & Kemsley Light Railway.

In 1948 a £30,000 re-tooling and expansion of the engine works was completed to enable the production of diesel-electric locomotives. Provision was made for erecting two locomotives at a time with the 2 year target of building one diesel-electric locomotive per week in addition to steam locomotive production.

In 1951, the company was sold to Brush Electrical Engineering, becoming Brush-Bagnall Traction, Ltd. In 1959, Bagnall's merged with local engine manufacturer Dorman Diesels; however in 1962 both were taken over by English Electric Co Ltd. English Electric then formed English Electric Traction, which amalgamated the two companies with Robert Stephenson and Hawthorns and Vulcan Foundry (acquired in 1955 by English Electric) to bring all their railway activities under one set of management.

Location 
The company was located at the Castle Engine Works, in Castletown, Stafford. The factory has been demolished. Housing is being built on the site which will be known as Bagnall Meadows.

Design 
Bagnalls introduced two types of locomotive valve gear the Baguley and the Bagnall-Price. They also used marine (circular) fireboxes on narrow gauge engines, a design that was cheap but needed a different firing technique.

Bagnall developed the inverted saddle tank. The two tanks were joined underneath the smokebox and supported the smokebox. Bagnall also commonly used the saddle tank which carries the water on top of the boiler.

Steam locomotives 
The company built many locomotives for use both domestically and for export.

Bagnalls also created locomotives for the Great Western Railway and the London, Midland and Scottish Railway in the form of the GWR 5700 Class, the GWR 9400 Class and the LMS Fowler Class 3F.

During World War II, Bagnall was subcontracted work for the Hunslet Austerity 0-6-0ST which resulted in 52 being manufactured from 1943 to 1947.

The Great Western Railway Bagnall GWR 9400 Class was numbered 8400–8449 and numbers 8400 to 8406 were employed on the former L.M.S. system at Bromsgrove giving banking assistance on the Lickey Incline.

Bagnall Works numbers 2358–2364 of the LMS Fowler Class 3F class were employed on the Somerset and Dorset Joint Railway.

LMS Fowler Class 3F No. 16539 (In the LMS 1934 renumbering scheme it became No.7456) was built by Bagnall in 1926 was one of two locomotives regauged by the London, Midland and Scottish Railway for the Northern Counties Committee, the other locomotive was built by Hunslet Engine Company of Leeds which lasted until 1963, the Bagnall lasted until 1956 when a suspect crank pin led to her early withdrawal.

The Victor/Vulcan 2994-6 locomotives were ordered by the Steel Company of Wales (SCOW) for their Abbey, Margam and Port Talbot works in 1950. They had a whole range of advanced features, such as 18" X 26" cylinders, together with piston valves, roller-type big-end and side-rod bearings, manganese steel axle-box and horn plate liners, hopper ashpans, self-cleaning smokeboxes, rocking grates and Lambets wet sanding. Steel fireboxes were used as well as "Owens" patent poppet valve and balanced regulator valves though surprisingly the locomotives weren't fitted with superheating. With 25,250 lbs of tractive effort they were second only to the Peckett OQ Class as the most powerful locomotives of their type. In later life 2994 and 2996 were sold to the Austin Motor Company and were named 'Victor' and 'Vulcan'. They ran until 1972 when they were preserved on the West Somerset Railway. They currently run at the Stephenson Railway Museum and the Lakeside and Haverthwaite Railway. 2995 was sold to NCB at the same time for use at a colliery and was scrapped in 1967.

Diesel locomotives 
Bagnalls produced diesel locomotives of their own design starting in 1933. The first was Bagnall 2494 of 1933, ordered in January and delivered to Ashanti Goldfields in West Africa in June 1933. It was  gauge and had two 4-wheel articulated bogies, allowing it to negotiate 60-foot radius curves and draw 200 tons. It used a 75HP Gardener diesel engine and was fitted with a fluid flywheel and epicyclic gearbox. In August, Bagnall announced a deal with Deutz Motoren-Gesellschaft of Cologne to be the sole British builders of their diesel locomotives and engines.

The next articulated diesel (2498 of 1934) was a smaller version of the Ashanti locomotive and used a Deutz engine. It was built for Halkyn District United Mines Ltd., Bryn Owel, Flintshire where it was used underground on the 2-mile 'main-line'. 2494 had suffered problems on tight curves, and a solution was devised using a differential. Three further engines were built for Ashanti with this modified design (2514 of 1934, 2546 of 1936 and 2568 of 1937), and a new gearbox was supplied for 2494. While the Halkyn engine was scrapped in 1937, the Ashanti engines had remarkably long lives.

Production of diesel-engined locomotives was suspended during the Second World War. After the war, Bagnall resumed building diesels, extending and re-tooling the works in 1948 to handle the production of diesel-electric locomotives, with the first locomotive supplied 1950 for the Steel Co of Wales, Port Talbot. This was followed by an order of 25 1000hp diesel-electric mainline locos fitted with Mirlees V12 engines for the Ceylon Government Railway as their M1 class, the last of which was withdrawn in 1983. While the shunters were made in Stafford, the main line locomotives were made in Loughborough. 

Other examples include the New Zealand TR class locomotive of which W.G Bagnall built seven in 1956–57.

Electric locomotives 
Bagnall also manufactured electric locomotives. Bagnalls worked with Siemens at the Siemens Stafford works to supply the electrical equipment for the locomotives.

Two Bagnall steam locomotives were converted to overhead electric for the Greaves Llechwyd Slate Mine. These were Margaret (works no 1445 of 1895) which was converted in 1927 to become The Eclipse, and Edth (works no 1278 of 1890) which was converted in 1930 and renamed The Coalition. Both locomotives survive and are at the Statfold Barn Railway.

Paraffin locomotives 
Paraffin locomotives were one of Bagnall's specialities and appear in most catalogues that Bagnall created.

Scale models 
There are few W.G. Bagnall RTR (ready to run) locomotives and kit locomotives. Here are a few examples.

Bachmann Branchline currently produce the OO gauge version of the LMS Fowler Class 3F which Bagnall built and Bachmann are currently manufacturing the Somerset and Dorset Joint Railway liveried Fowler 3F which has been correctly numbered to number 23 which is a number of one of the Bagnall 3Fs, it also features printed Bagnall name plates.

Mercian Models produce possibly Bagnall's most advanced locomotive to date in 7mm scale (O gauge) The Victor/Vulcan locomotives are in two forms; the complete kit which features the body kit, frames, detailing, motor, gearbox and wheels, and the kit only option which features everything except the motor, gearbox and wheels.

There are a few custom kits as well. If you look at the gallery there is an O16.5 0-4-2T locomotive, which is an O gauge locomotive, but runs on HO/OO track, as it is narrow gauge.

In 2014, Hornby introduced a representation of a preserved four-wheeled Diesel shunter into their budget Railroad range utilising the body from "Dart" from the Thomas The Tank Engine range.

Gallery

Preservation

Operational 
 BN 1965 0-6-0 Powelltown Tramway

See also 
 Bagnall fireless locomotives (preserved)
 Bagnall 0-4-0ST "Alfred" and "Judy"
 Bagnall 0-4-0ST No. 19
 Bagnall boiler

References

External links 

 Foxfield Light Railway stocklist
 Amberley Working Museum locomotives
 Short article provided by Bagnall apprentice
 9400 tank class introduction The Great Western Archive

Companies based in Stafford
Manufacturing companies of England
Bagnall
Defunct manufacturing companies of the United Kingdom